That's Life is the seventh studio album by English singer-songwriter Julia Fordham, released in 2004.

Track listing
All tracks written by Julia Fordham, except where noted.

Personnel
Adapted from AllMusic.

Vinnie Colaiuta – drums
Julia Fordham – vocals, background vocals
Brian "Big Bass" Gardner – mastering
Billy Goodrum – interlude arranger
Helik Hadar – engineer, mixing
Larry Klein – audio production, bass guitar, keyboards
Greg Leisz – pedal steel guitar
Jamie Muhoberac – Fender Rhodes, piano, Wurlitzer Piano
Melanie Nissen	– photography
Dean Parks – guitar, baritone guitar
Cindi Peters – production coordination
Billy Preston – Hammond B-3 organ
Chris Rakestraw – assistant
David Ricketts – string arrangements
Lee Thornburg – trombone (valve), trumpet
Amy L. VonHolzhausen – design
Joey Waronker – drums, percussion
Albert Wing – tenor saxophone
Jeff Young – Hammond B-3, vocals
Jeff Scott Young – vocals, background vocals

References

External links
That's Life at Discogs

2004 albums
Vanguard Records albums
Julia Fordham albums
Albums produced by Larry Klein